My Chemical Romance (commonly abbreviated to MCR or My Chem) is an American rock band from Newark, New Jersey. The band's current lineup consists of lead vocalist Gerard Way, lead guitarist Ray Toro, rhythm guitarist Frank Iero, and bassist Mikey Way, who is Gerard’s younger brother. They are considered one of the most influential rock groups of the 2000s and a major act in the pop-punk and emo genres, despite the band rejecting the latter label.

Founded on September 12, 2001, by Gerard, Mikey, Toro, and drummer Matt Pelissier (and later joined by Iero), the band signed with Eyeball Records and released their debut album, I Brought You My Bullets, You Brought Me Your Love, in 2002. They signed with Reprise Records the next year and released their major-label debut, Three Cheers for Sweet Revenge, in 2004. Shortly after the album's release, Pelissier was replaced by Bob Bryar. The album was a commercial success, attaining platinum status over a year later.

The success of the band's previous albums was eclipsed by that of their 2006 rock opera concept album, The Black Parade, which was a major commercial success, with lead single "Welcome to the Black Parade" topping the UK singles chart. The album solidified the band's following, despite negative coverage in the Daily Mail generating controversy. The band's fourth studio album, Danger Days: The True Lives of the Fabulous Killjoys, was released in 2010. Bryar departed the band prior to the release of the album, and in 2012, they added touring keyboardist James Dewees. In 2012 and 2013, the band released a series of singles they had recorded in 2009 under the collective title Conventional Weapons. My Chemical Romance announced its breakup on March 22, 2013. In 2014, a greatest hits album titled May Death Never Stop You was released and a tenth-anniversary reissue of The Black Parade was released in 2016.

On October 31, 2019, the band announced a reunion show, which took place in Los Angeles on December 20, 2019. In January 2020, they announced additional shows and a Reunion Tour, which commenced in 2022 after a two-year postponement due to the COVID-19 pandemic.

History

Early career and I Brought You My Bullets, You Brought Me Your Love (2001–2002)

The band was formed by frontman Gerard Way and drummer Matt Pelissier in Newark, New Jersey, soon after the September 11 attacks. Witnessing the World Trade Center towers fall influenced Way's life to the extent that he decided to start a band. Shortly thereafter, Ray Toro was recruited as the band's guitarist because at the time Way could not sing and play the guitar simultaneously. Way has said "music was this thing I secretly wanted to do" and later wrote the song "Skylines and Turnstiles" to express his feelings about September 11.

The name of the band was suggested by bass guitarist Mikey Way, younger brother of Gerard, who was working in a Barnes & Noble when he was struck by the title of a book by Irvine Welsh named Ecstasy: Three Tales of Chemical Romance. The first recording sessions were undertaken in Pelissier's attic, where the songs "Our Lady of Sorrows" and "Cubicles" were recorded. The band refers to those sessions as "The Attic Demos". After hearing the demo and dropping out of college, Mikey Way decided to join the band. While with Eyeball Records, the band met Frank Iero, the lead vocalist and guitarist for Pencey Prep. Following Pencey Prep's split in 2002, Iero became a member of My Chemical Romance, just days prior to the recording of the band's debut album. They recorded their debut album, I Brought You My Bullets, You Brought Me Your Love, just three months after the formation of the band and released it in 2002 through Eyeball Records. The album was produced by Thursday frontman Geoff Rickly after the band became friends with him while playing shows in New Jersey. Iero played guitar on two of the tracks, one of which was "Early Sunsets Over Monroeville". During this time, the band was booked at the infamous venue Big Daddy's, where it began to receive more attention.

My Chemical Romance offered free downloads through PureVolume and the social networking website MySpace, where they gained an initial fan base.

Major label signing and Three Cheers for Sweet Revenge (2003–2006)

On August 31, 2003, the band announced via their website that they had signed a deal with Reprise Records. Following a tour with Avenged Sevenfold, the band began working on their second album, which was titled Three Cheers for Sweet Revenge, which was released on June 8, 2004. A month after the album's release, the band replaced Matt Pelissier with Bob Bryar. The band released four singles from the album: "I'm Not Okay (I Promise)", "Thank You for the Venom", "Helena", and "The Ghost of You". The album went platinum in just over a year after its release.

At the beginning of 2005, the band was featured on the first Taste of Chaos tour along with The Used and Killswitch Engage. The band also was the opening act for Green Day on their American Idiot tour. They then co-headlined Warped Tour 2005 with Fall Out Boy and co-headlined a tour with Alkaline Trio and Reggie and the Full Effect around the US. That same year, My Chemical Romance collaborated with The Used for a cover of the Queen and David Bowie classic, "Under Pressure", which was released as a benefit single for tsunami relief on iTunes and other Internet outlets.

In March 2006, the album Life on the Murder Scene was released, incorporating a CD and two DVDs. It included one documentary DVD chronicling the band's history, and a second DVD with music videos, the making of their videos and live performances. An unauthorized biography DVD Things That Make You Go MMM! was also released in June 2006. The DVD does not actually feature any My Chemical Romance music clips or performances but contains interviews with those who knew the band before much of their fame. A biography titled Something Incredible This Way Comes was also released, written by Paul Stenning and published in 2006. It features information on their beginnings right through to their third album, The Black Parade.

The Black Parade (2006–2009)

My Chemical Romance started recording their third studio album on April 10, 2006 with Rob Cavallo, producer of many of Green Day's albums. It was originally thought to be titled The Rise and Fall of My Chemical Romance (in reference to The Rise and Fall of Ziggy Stardust and the Spiders from Mars by David Bowie), but in an interview with Kerrang! magazine, Gerard Way suggested this was just the album's working title, stating "It was never the title of the album, more a spoof, or joke."

On August 3, 2006, the band completed shooting the videos for their first two singles from the album, "Welcome to the Black Parade" and although not released until January 2007, "Famous Last Words". Both videos were directed by Samuel Bayer, director of Nirvana's "Smells Like Teen Spirit" and Green Day's American Idiot videos. During filming for the second video, band members Gerard Way and Bob Bryar were injured. Way suffered torn ligaments in his ankle, and Bryar a burn to the leg which caused a severe staph infection that needed constant monitoring in the hospital. Consequently, the band was forced to cancel a few tour dates. While these injuries were reported by several news agencies to have been the result of a car accident, a statement released by the band on their website and MySpace page confirmed that these injuries occurred on the set of the video.On August 22, 2006, the band played a special one-off show at the 1,800-capacity London Hammersmith Palais. The show sold out in 15 minutes, which led to tickets being re-sold on eBay at prices well above face value. The name of the album was announced and 20 people dressed in black capes with their faces obscured paraded around the Hammersmith venue, followed by a large group of fans and street team members with signs saying "The Black Parade". Later during the show, the album title and the UK release date were confirmed. Before the band took the stage, it was announced that My Chemical Romance was unable to play, but they would be replaced by The Black Parade. After initial crowd hostility, it became clear the band was simply performing under a pseudonym in keeping with the theme of the album. Since then, the band would often perform under the alias "The Black Parade", wearing the costumes seen in the album's music videos. Gerard Way would adopt the persona of the leader of the marching band, The Black Parade, and vary his behavior and performance accordingly. The band were bottled during a performance at the Reading Festival by fans of the band Slayer, who performed before them at the festival; Way later described it as their "greatest victory as a show".

"Welcome to the Black Parade" was released as a single on September 11, 2006. On September 26, 2006, the music video for "Welcome to the Black Parade" was released in the UK, and on September 27 in the US. The single became the band's first number one on the UK Singles Chart in October 2006. The Black Parade was released on October 23, 2006, in the United Kingdom and on October 24, 2006, in the United States to positive reviews. In the US, "Welcome to the Black Parade" reached number nine on the Billboard Hot 100, making it the band's only top ten hit to date on the chart. 

The Black Parade World Tour commenced on February 22, 2007, with the eventuating 133 shows featuring Rise Against, Thursday and Muse as support acts. Reggie and the Full Effect frontman James Dewees joined the band to play keyboards and synthesizer from there on. In April 2007, it was announced that Mikey Way would temporarily leave the tour to spend time with his new wife, Alicia Simmons-Way. Way's temporary replacement was Matt Cortez, a friend of the band. During the third leg of the tour, as a support act for Muse, members of My Chemical Romance and their crew, along with members of Muse's crew, suffered food poisoning, and consequently had to cancel six shows. The band later featured on Linkin Park's Projekt Revolution tour in 2007, along with Placebo, Mindless Self Indulgence, Saosin, Taking Back Sunday and HIM.

My Chemical Romance received a range of accolades for The Black Parade. Kerrang! rated The Black Parade as the fourth-greatest album of 2006. In Rolling Stone magazine's ranking of the top 50 albums of 2006, The Black Parade was voted the 20th best album of the year. My Chemical Romance went on to win the award for Best International Band at the 2007 NME Awards, and Gerard Way also won the Hero of the Year award. My Chemical Romance was also nominated for Best Alternative Group at the 2007 American Music Awards.

The band announced in a blog on their website that they would be going on a final tour in the United States before taking a break. At the same time, they announced they will be releasing a live DVD/CD collection titled The Black Parade Is Dead!, which includes two concerts from October 2007, the final Black Parade concert in Mexico, and a small show at Maxwell's in New Jersey. The DVD/CD was meant to be released on June 24 in the United States and June 30 in the UK, but was postponed to July 1 because of a technical fault with the Mexico concert. On February 3, 2009, an EP of B-side songs from singles on The Black Parade was released, titled The Black Parade: The B-Sides. The band then announced that they would be releasing "a collection of nine never-before-seen live videos, straight from the encore set of the Mexico City show from October 2007" during their Black Parade World Tour, titled ¡Venganza!. The release came on a bullet-shaped flash drive and also contained exclusive photos of the band from the show. It was released on April 29, 2009.

Daily Mail controversy 

British tabloid Daily Mail characterised the band and their fans as "emo" and a "cult of self-harm" in 2006. The Guardian described My Chemical Romance's perceived association with emo originated from "Iero's appearance, their debut being produced by a member of Thursday, and the band members' openness about their mental-health issues" while acknowledging major stylistic differences between emo and My Chemical Romance's music. The band disputed their association with emo and the characterisation of their music as dangerous, comparing it to controversies surrounding Judas Priest in the 1980s. The media attention, which coincided with the release of The Black Parade, is thought to have boosted the band's popularity in the UK.

On May 16, 2008, the Daily Mail published an article titled "Why no child is safe from the sinister cult of emo". It discussed the suicide of a thirteen-year-old British girl named Hannah Bond, who supposedly took her life because of her involvement in an "emo cult" which the newspaper directly associated with My Chemical Romance and their fans, and their then-current album The Black Parade. The basis for the article was a statement by coroner Roger Sykes from the investigation into Bond's death, who expressed concern that her "emo" lifestyle glamorized suicide and suggested that her obsession with My Chemical Romance was linked to her death. The Mail followed this with several stories also describing the band and emo as a "sinister cult" and "dangerous". Supporters of emo music contacted NME to defend the genre against accusations that it promotes suicide. The band responded by paying tribute to Bond, saying that their music is "anti-violence and anti-suicide" and aiming to provide comfort and solace to fans, and encouraged fans experiencing feelings of depression or suicide to seek help.

A group of British fans eventually planned a march across London in protest against the depiction of the band in the media. The march was expected to be held on May 31, beginning at Hyde Park's West Pond and ending outside the offices of the Daily Mail. The march was expected to attract 500–1,000 protesters, according to the organizers. After concerns by police, the march was called off and instead about 100 fans congregated at Marble Arch. The band repeated the statement "fuck the Daily Mail" during their gigs in the United Kingdom.

The Daily Mail defended its position saying its coverage was "balanced and restrained" and "in the public interest" and that they were reporting genuine concerns raised by the coroner at the inquest. They stated that their coverage of the coroner's remarks and the parents' comments was in common with that of other newspapers and pointed to their publishing of readers' letters defending the band and positive reviews of the band's albums and tours. Kerrang! later described the original story as having a "heavy-handed approach and factual inaccuracies" and demonised the emo subculture. In a 2022 retrospective, The Guardian described the backlash against the band and emo music as a "moral panic".

Danger Days: The True Lives of the Fabulous Killjoys (2009–2011)

On February 1, 2009, My Chemical Romance released a new single titled "Desolation Row" (a cover of the Bob Dylan song). It was recorded to feature as the end credit track for the 2009 film Watchmen, an adaptation of the graphic novel of the same name.

On May 27, 2009, My Chemical Romance's web designer, Jeff Watson, announced via the band's website that the band was headed to the studio to record their fourth full-length album. The recording took place over the following few weeks with producer Brendan O'Brien, who has worked with AC/DC, Mastodon, and Pearl Jam.

In an interview with NME, Gerard Way said the band's next record would be a rock album, saying, "I think [the next album] will definitely be stripped down. I think the band misses being a rock band." In a separate interview with Idiomag, Way commented that the next release would be less theatrical in scope, stating that "it's not going to be hiding behind a veil of fiction or uniforms and makeup anymore." In an interview with PopEater, Way also stated that the next album will be "full of hate". He also said "over the years that we've been hearing ourselves live and hearing us on records, we kind of prefer the live. There's more of a garage feel and more energy. I'd like to capture some of that, finally. That's the goal for the next one."

On July 31 and August 1, 2009, My Chemical Romance played two "secret" shows at The Roxy Theater in Los Angeles. The shows were the first concerts the band had played since Madison Square Garden in May 2008. The band also premiered several new songs said to be from their upcoming fourth album during the shows, one reportedly titled "Death Before Disco", a song that Way said he was particularly excited about. The song was since renamed "Party Poison" and was included on the new album. Way explained further in a Rolling Stone interview that "it's a completely different sound for the band — it's like an anti-party song that you can party to. I can't wait for people to hear it. It brings back, lyrically, some of that wonderful fiction from the first album."

Gerard Way also said in a November 2009 interview with Rock Sound that the fourth album would be their defining work. "A friend who heard the record recently said he now had no interest in listening to our older work anymore, that we had made all our old material redundant. I took it as a compliment, the next thing you should always make the last thing seem unimportant and I think that will happen when we finally release this album."

On March 3, 2010, Iero announced on their official website that Bob Bryar had left the band, writing:

In a March 2010 MTV interview about the new album, Way explained, "There's no title yet ... I'm actually kind of excited about that. It's kind of 'anything goes' at this point, but I'm so happy with the songs." Though the band since decided on the title of their fourth album, it continued to go unannounced, with various rumors circulating and the band stating on their website that it will be revealed "all in due time" and in Way's words, "a special way this time. Maybe some sort of event, something fun, something soon."

During the San Diego Comic-Con 2010, Way announced that the band had finished recording the fourth studio album. This was later confirmed by Iero on the band's website, announcing that the album was "done, finished, kaput, in the proverbial can, and being played loudly as we drive way too fast in our respective cars."

In September, a trailer video was uploaded to My Chemical Romance's official YouTube page titled Art is a Weapon, which announced the title of the album: Danger Days: The True Lives of the Fabulous Killjoys. The video featured the band wearing strangely colored outfits and battling unusual characters in a desert surrounding, and featuring a sample of music from the song "Na Na Na (Na Na Na Na Na Na Na Na Na)". Notable comic book author and the band's personal friend, Grant Morrison, makes a special appearance, in the role of an enemy and leader of a band of masked characters. On September 22, 2010, the band premiered their song "Na Na Na (Na Na Na Na Na Na Na Na Na)" on Zane Lowe's BBC Radio 1 show, and Los Angeles-based radio station KROQ-FM. The album was released on November 22, 2010.

Rock Sound had a preview of the album and gave a positive review, commenting "the way they've used everything they learned on The Black Parade and tightened up in certain places feels natural and confident" and that it sees "the creativity of the band taking flight musically, graphically and literally."

Michael Pedicone joined the band as a touring drummer late in 2010, replacing Bryar.

During a performance at Wembley Arena on February 12, 2011, Way announced that the band would be appearing at a UK festival later in the year, later confirmed as the Reading and Leeds Festivals, which they headlined. They also performed at Radio 1's Big Weekend in Carlisle, England on May 15, 2011.

On September 2, 2011, Frank Iero posted a blog on the band's site stating, "The relationship between My Chemical Romance and Michael Pedicone is over" and explaining Pedicone was sacked because "he was caught red-handed stealing from the band and confessed to police after our show last night in Auburn, Washington." He also mentioned his hope of getting a new drummer in time for their next show and avoiding having to cancel any performances in the process.

On September 4, 2011, it was revealed through various sources that Jarrod Alexander will be the new touring drummer for the remainder of the Honda Civic tour. He also performed with them in late October at Voodoo Experience and at their Australian + New Zealand shows at Big Day Out in early 2012.

Conventional Weapons and break-up (2011–2013)

In an interview with Rolling Stone in October 2011, guitarist Frank Iero revealed that new music could be out "by summer".

On April 28, 2011, US broadcaster Glenn Beck labelled the My Chemical Romance song "Sing" as "propaganda" after it was featured and covered on the US musical drama TV series Glee in February 2011. Beck stated "It's an anthem saying 'Join us'. How can you and I possibly win against that?"
The lyrics that Beck pointed out were: "Cleaned up corporation progress, dying in the process / Children that can talk about it living on the railways  / People moving sideways / Sell it till your last days / Buy yourself the motivation / Generation nothing / Nothing but a dead scene / Product of a white dream". Gerard Way responded to the accusation on the band's official website, writing, "I think the word Glenn Beck was looking for was 'subversion' not 'propaganda', because I don't know what it would be considered propaganda for—truth? Sentiment?" He also said that he was "shocked that no actual fact-checking was done on the lyrics". Bassist Mikey Way told the BBC, "If we're getting reaction from people like that we're doing something right."

On December 18, 2011, the band appeared on Nick Jr.'s Yo Gabba Gabba!, and performed a song called "Every Snowflake Is Different (Just Like You)". This was part of a Christmas special for the show. The special includes other famous guest appearances such as Tony Hawk and Tori Spelling.

In February 2012, members of My Chemical Romance revealed that they had been building a studio in Los Angeles to record music for the band's fifth album under the working title MCR5, now with touring keyboardist James Dewees as an official member. The band worked with engineer Doug McKean, who previously worked on The Black Parade and Danger Days: The True Lives of the Fabulous Killjoys. On September 14, 2012, Frank Iero announced through the band's official website a new project titled Conventional Weapons. The project revolved around 10 unreleased songs that were recorded in 2009, prior to the making of Danger Days. The band released two songs each month for five months from the Conventional Weapons sessions, starting in October 2012 and finishing in February 2013. According to the October 2012 issue of Q Magazine, Frank Iero reported early sessions for MCR's next album with the new drummer Jarrod Alexander were progressing well. "Jarrod is a rad guy and a fantastic player. It's been really fun making music with him these past few months," Iero commented.

On March 22, 2013, the band announced their break-up on their official website, issuing this statement:

Gerard Way posted an extended tweet on his Twitter account two days after the website announcement, in which he confirmed the disbanding of the group but denied that altercations between band members were the reason for the split.

May Death Never Stop You and post-breakup (2013–2019)
On March 25, 2014, the band released a greatest hits collection, titled May Death Never Stop You, containing material spreading their entire career, as well a single unreleased track. The track "Fake Your Death" was made available digitally on February 17. It is the only song in MCR's discography having James Dewees playing on keyboards.

Following the band's breakup, the members of the band continued to pursue music. Lead vocalist Gerard Way announced his debut solo album Hesitant Alien with the release of an advance-single, "Action Cat". Hesitant Alien was released on September 29, 2014, in the UK, and a day later in the U.S. Hesitant Alien was a moderate commercial success, topping the US Billboard Alternative Albums chart and reaching No. 16 on the US Billboard 200. Hesitant Alien also topped the "Ten Essential Albums Of 2014" list in Alternative Press.

Rhythm guitarist Frank Iero sporadically collaborated with My Chemical Romance keyboardist James Dewees, forming Death Spells and performing in Reggie and the Full Effect (alongside Ray Toro), releasing No Country for Old Musicians on November 19, 2013. Afterwards, he announced via his official website that he signed to Staple Records and would be releasing a full-length solo album titled Stomachaches under the moniker of "frnkiero andthe cellabration". The album featured former My Chemical Romance touring drummer Jarrod Alexander. Stomachaches was released worldwide on August 25, 2014.

Bassist Mikey Way formed Electric Century along with Sleep Station vocalist David Debiak in 2014 and released their debut single "I Lied" in February 2014. The duo announced their debut self-titled EP on March 10, 2015, and it was released on Record Store Day on April 18, 2015.

Lead guitarist Ray Toro posted a song on his SoundCloud account titled "Isn't That Something" on May 24, 2013. On January 1, 2015, he posted a new song, titled "For the Lost and Brave", on his website, dedicating the song to Leelah Alcorn, a transgender teen who committed suicide.

On July 20, 2016, the band posted on their official Twitter and Facebook pages a video with the piano intro from "Welcome to the Black Parade", ending with a cryptic date, "9/23/16". The video was also published on the band's YouTube channel with the video titled "MCRX". This led to numerous rumors and reports on the band's possible reunion until it was revealed to be a reissue of The Black Parade with unreleased demos. The reissue, titled The Black Parade/Living with Ghosts, includes 11 demos and live tracks. Two months before its release, an early version of "Welcome to the Black Parade", titled "The Five of Us Are Dying", was made available for streaming.

In a discussion of his work on the comic book Doom Patrol, Gerard Way told Billboard, "I wouldn't count (a reunion) out, but at the same time everybody's doing stuff in their lives now that they're really enjoying."

Reunion and new material (2019–present)

On October 31, 2019, the band announced they would be reuniting in Los Angeles on December 20 and a new merchandise line. The announcement was accompanied by the captions "Return" and "Like Phantoms Forever...". The show sold out in 4 minutes despite high ticket prices. Believed initially to be a one-off show, almost a week later, the band announced more dates in Australia, Japan and New Zealand for 2020. They later revealed via Twitter that they had first regrouped in 2017 and had been working together since then, before the official 2019 announcement. The concert grossed $1,451,745, with an attendance of 5,113.

In January 2020, the group announced plans to present one, then two, then three concerts at Stadium MK (Milton Keynes, England), on the 18th, 20th and 21 June 2020, as tickets for each day sold out within minutes.  The stadium has an (all round) capacity of 30,500 for sports events. Later in the month, the group premiered a cryptic video on YouTube which ended by announcing a North American tour. The North American shows went on sale on January 31, 2020, and sold out in less than six hours. Due to the ongoing COVID-19 pandemic, all of the shows on the tour that were set to begin in 2020 were postponed to 2021, including the North American leg. These tour dates were later rescheduled again to 2022. The tour commenced on 16 May 2022 at the Eden Project.

On May 12, 2022, the band released "The Foundations of Decay", their first new song since 2014.

Artistry

Musical style
My Chemical Romance's music has been categorized primarily as alternative rock, emo, pop-punk, post-hardcore, punk rock, and hard rock. The band has also had its music categorized as emo pop, hardcore punk, gothic rock, pop rock, arena rock, glam rock, heavy metal, metalcore, rock, pop, screamo, and garage punk.

Gerard Way has publicly rejected the term "emo", describing the genre as "fucking garbage". However, Way has reportedly also described the band's style as "What-else-ya-got-emo".

Way's vocals have been described as "theatrical", and espousing "introspective, confessional lyrics".

Albums
The band's debut album, features a raw sound that has guitar riffs, very energetic vocals and sometimes screaming. The album has been described as emo, post-hardcore, alternative rock, screamo, punk rock, gothic rock, pop punk, and garage punk, with influences from hardcore punk and heavy metal.

Three Cheers for Sweet Revenge was described as alternative rock, emo, pop punk, post-hardcore, and punk rock.

The band's third album, The Black Parade, has been described as alternative rock, emo, pop punk, post-hardcore, punk rock, and hard rock, with influences from 1970s classic rock, glam rock, pop, and gothic rock.

The band's fourth album, Danger Days: The True Lives of the Fabulous Killjoys, integrated elements of power pop, pop rock, and electronic rock into their sound.

Influences

Gerard Way said to Rolling Stone, "we love bands like Queen, where it's huge and majestic, but also bands like Black Flag and the Misfits, who would go absolutely crazy." Way has stated that the band is heavily influenced by Queen, Misfits, Black Flag, Iron Maiden, the Cure, Joy Division, Bauhaus, Siouxsie and the Banshees, the Smiths and Morrissey. Way has also said that his band patterns their career after that of the Smashing Pumpkins, another band they admire. Frank Iero cites the punk band Lifetime as a big influence. My Chemical Romance's other influences include the Stooges, Ramones, Sex Pistols, the Clash, Minor Threat, Nirvana, and Operation Ivy. They also have noted that their lives, childhoods, books they've read and movies they've seen have influenced their music.

Legacy

Music and popular culture 
According to Rolling Stone, the band played "somewhat of an anomaly in New Jersey's then-burgeoning pop-punk and emo scene", before achieving their breakthrough with an "instant emo classic" Three Cheers for Sweet Revenge, while Spin described it as one of the albums that launched the emo genre into the mainstream. In 2022, The Guardian wrote that during the height of their career they were "unlikely superstars, misfits who inadvertently infiltrated the mainstream" but upon their reunion tour, the band "return to a pop cultural landscape they helped to define". The New York Timess Christopher R. Weingarten has noted that The Black Parade inspired a number of 2010s musicians in different genres, including Twenty One Pilots, Crown the Empire, Famous Last Words, Halsey, fun, Billie Eilish and Post Malone, and even influenced the sound of movie musicals like Frozen II. In 2016, Nylon wrote that the record "took the idea of a concept album and exploited it for the digital age", while being musically a rock opera "as ambitious as any post-Queen rock opera could be". Speaking on the band's reception and criticism during the early 2000s, NPR Music wrote that, "at a moment when mannered indie-pop and roughshod garage-rock were infiltrating the mainstream, [the band] was earnest, dramatic and unapologetically massive, in a way that made it conspicuously uncool," and deemed The Black Parade a "defining album" for a generation of pop-punk fans.

In 2020, Kerrang! deemed the band "the rock superstars of the 21st century" while stating that "no other band has had such a musical or cultural impact over recent years." The magazine also noted their influence in "the current music scene" of alternative rock. Vice named My Chemical Romance the "artist of the decade", with writer Hannah Ewens commenting that they "influenced rock throughout the 2010s—even though they were inactive for most of the decade." In Paste magazine, Eli Enis wrote that "it is pretty much accepted canon at this point that My Chemical Romance are one of the most significant rock bands this side of the millennium." James McMahon of The Independent stated that Gerard Way "set a blueprint for emo's image of pale face, raven-black hair and perhaps a red tie, for almost 20 years." Writing on the band's influence, Entertainment Weeklys Kyle Anderson stated that they "offered up spiritual solutions to real problems, and they did it with huge riffs and big theatrical stage shows, with rarely a hint of irony or detachment... it's unlikely there will ever be a band quite like them again."

LGBT community 
In Archer, Vince Ruston commented on the band's popularity in the queer and LGBT communities: "My Chemical Romance wanted to speak to and raise up every person who had ever felt outcast, downtrodden, or alienated. Queer teens were a huge part of that demographic". Similarly, Michelle Hyun Kim described Gerard Way as a "queer icon" in Them, and that "after the band announced their reunion on Halloween 2019, I saw tweets from LGBTQ+ folks around the world claiming, in some way or another, that MCR either served as a queer awakening or fostered their queerness." The band have long been supportive of LGBT rights and embraced their LGBT fandom.

Tours

2000s
My Chemical Romance played in many major tours of 2005. The band toured with Green Day in 2005 on the "Green Day Presents American Idiot Tour". They were also part of the Warped Tour in the same year. "For a lot of kids, it's the one thing they look forward to all year," said Gerard Way of the Warped Tour. "They save up for it. They get to see all the bands they like in one shot." Their set list included mostly songs from Three Cheers for Sweet Revenge.

My Chemical Romance co-headlined the main stage with The Used on the Taste of Chaos tour, before starting their first headlining tour, simply named the "My Chemical Romance Tour".  The tour launched September 15 in Ohio, stopping at 30 locations in the United States, to promote their album, Three Cheers for Sweet Revenge. Supporting acts included Alkaline Trio and Reggie and the Full Effect. This tour marked the beginning of the heavy theatrics later showcased in many of their live shows. Way expressed his plans for the tour in an interview with MTV, saying, "we'd talked about bringing out dancers for our headlining tour in the fall, but it's a big undertaking; you have to have a bus full of dancers. We've always wanted to do a big theatrical tour. But you have to do it in steps".

The band joined headliners Linkin Park on Projekt Revolution 2007, starting on July 25 and ending on September 3, 2007. The band played a one-hour set on center stage, opening with "This Is How I Disappear", as flames burst behind the band. The set ended with "Cancer", occasionally accompanied by falling confetti, and fireworks.  Following the Projekt Revolution tour, they opened for Bon Jovi in October and then departed for a European Tour with Mindless Self Indulgence.

2010s

On September 19, 2010, the band announced "The World Contamination Tour", which took place in parts of the UK, France, Amsterdam and Germany.

The band embarked on a joint tour of the United States with Blink-182 in 2011.

The band reunited out of the public eye in 2017 and announced a reunion show on October 31, 2019, which took place in Los Angeles on December 20, 2019, extending this to a small tour consisting of dates in Australia, New Zealand and Japan a week later.

2020s

On January 28, 2020, the group announced plans to present three concerts in Milton Keynes (UK), on 18, 20 and 21 of June 2020. On January 29, 2020, the band announced a North American tour.

In April 2020, during the COVID-19 pandemic, the group postponed its Milton Keynes events, initially to June 2021. In June 2020, the band postponed all North American events to September and October 2021. In April 2021, the Milton Keynes concert was postponed again to May 2022. The rest of the tour was later postponed to 2022.

Band members

Current members
 Gerard Way – lead vocals (2001–2013, 2019–present)
 Ray Toro – lead guitar, backing vocals (2001–2013, 2019–present); rhythm guitar (2001–2002)
 Mikey Way – bass guitar (2001–2013, 2019–present)
 Frank Iero – rhythm guitar, backing vocals (2002–2013, 2019–present)

Current touring musicians
 Jarrod Alexander – drums, percussion (2011–2013, 2019–present)
 Jamie Muhoberac – keyboards (2019–present)

Former members
 Matt Pelissier – drums, percussion (2001–2004)
 Bob Bryar – drums, percussion (2004–2010)
 James Dewees – keyboards, percussion, backing vocals (2012–2013; touring 2007–2012)

Former touring musicians
 Pete Parada – drums, percussion (2007)
 Matt Cortez – rhythm guitar (2007–2008), bass guitar (2007)
 Tucker Rule – drums, percussion (2007–2008)
 Todd Price – rhythm guitar (2008)
 Michael Pedicone – drums, percussion (2010–2011)

Timeline

Discography

 I Brought You My Bullets, You Brought Me Your Love (2002)
 Three Cheers for Sweet Revenge (2004)
 The Black Parade (2006)
 Danger Days: The True Lives of the Fabulous Killjoys (2010)

Filmography

See also
 List of artists who reached number one on the U.S. alternative rock chart
 List of awards and nominations received by My Chemical Romance

Notes

References

Further reading

External links

 
 
 
 
 

 
2001 establishments in New Jersey
2013 disestablishments in New Jersey
Alternative rock groups from New Jersey
American punk rock groups
Emo musical groups from New Jersey
American post-hardcore musical groups
Bands with fictional stage personas
Culture of Jersey City, New Jersey
Musical groups disestablished in 2013
Musical groups established in 2001
Musical groups reestablished in 2019
Musical quintets
NME Awards winners
Pop punk groups from New Jersey
Reprise Records artists
Warner Records artists
Sibling musical groups
Musicians from New Jersey
Musical groups from New Jersey
LGBT-themed musical groups
Music controversies
2008 controversies